Goodbye is the final album by saxophonist Gene Ammons recorded in 1974 and released on the Prestige label.

Reception
The Allmusic review stated "It is ironic that on tenor saxophonist Gene Ammons' final recording date, the last song he performed was the standard "Goodbye." That emotional rendition is the high point of this session... It's a fine ending to a colorful career".

Track listing 
All compositions by Gene Ammons except as indicated
 "Sticks" (Cannonball Adderley) - 6:29     
 "Alone Again (Naturally)" (Gilbert O'Sullivan) - 5:58     
 "It Don't Mean a Thing (If It Ain't Got That Swing)" (Duke Ellington, Irving Mills) - 5:41     
 "Jeannine" (Duke Pearson) - 7:14     
 "Geru's Blues" - 7:36     
 "Goodbye" (Gordon Jenkins) - 4:32

Personnel 
Gene Ammons - tenor saxophone 
Nat Adderley - cornet
Gary Bartz - alto saxophone
Kenny Drew - piano
Sam Jones - bass
Louis Hayes - drums
Ray Barretto - congas (tracks 1-5)

References 

1975 albums
Prestige Records albums
Gene Ammons albums
Albums produced by Orrin Keepnews